"Nothing Broken but My Heart" is a song by Canadian singer Celine Dion, recorded for her second English-language album, Celine Dion (1992). It was released as the third single in Canada, United States and Japan in August 1992, and fourth in Australia in January 1993. Written by Diane Warren and produced by Walter Afanasieff, it topped the adult contemporary charts in both the United States and Canada. The song was the second Dion's single which reached number-one position on the US Billboard Hot Adult Contemporary Tracks chart. It peaked at number three in Canada and number 29 in the United States. In 1994, "Nothing Broken but My Heart" won an ASCAP Pop Award for most performed song in the United States.

Critical reception
Larry Flick from Billboard declared the song as a "melodramatic power ballad", noting that its "booming production values and a tearful vocal will push all the right buttons". Randy Clark from Cashbox felt it is "full of Celine's brilliant power, and sounds like it might be another AC success." Rufer and Fell from the Gavin Report commented, "A Diane Warren song sung by Ms. Dion's velvet hammer voice. An unbeatable combination does it again". In an retrospective review, Christopher Smith of Talk About Pop Music stated that it "throws everything possible in, some electric guitars, Celine’s soaring vocals and a beautiful, long fade out".

Music video
The accompanying music video for "Nothing Broken but My Heart" was made for the edited version, because the original track lasts almost six minutes. It was released in August 1992 and features actors practicing the Romeo and Juliet play. It was directed by Lyne Charlebois and filmed in Montreal.

Live performances
Dion performed the song for the first time on 14 July 1992 during her appearance on The Tonight Show with Jay Leno. She also performed it during her Celine Dion in Concert tour in 1992 and 1993

Track listing
 Australian CD and cassette single
"Nothing Broken but My Heart" – 5:55
"Unison" – 4:12

 Japanese 3", North American 7" and cassette single
"Nothing Broken but My Heart" (Radio Edit) – 4:12
"Unison" (Single Mix) – 4:04

Credits and personnel

Celine Dion – lead and background vocals
Diane Warren – songwriting
Walter Afanasieff – producer, arranger, keyboards, synthesized bass, drum and rhythm programming
Michael Landau – guitars
Ren Klyce – akai and synclavier programming
Gary Cirimelli – macintosh and synclavier programming, background vocals
Dan Shea – additional keyboards, macintosh programming
Claytoven Richardson – background vocals
Melisa Kary – background vocals
Jeanie Tracey – background vocals
Vicki Randle – background vocals
Kitty Beethoven – background vocals
Sandy Griffith – background vocals
Dana Jon Chappelle – engineer, mixer
Neill King – second engineer
Mark Hensley – second engineer
Bruce Colder – second engineer
Michael Gilbert – second engineer
Barbara Stout – production coordinator

Charts

Weekly charts

Year-end charts

Release history

See also
List of Hot Adult Contemporary number ones of 1992

References

External links

1992 singles
1992 songs
1990s ballads
Celine Dion songs
Pop ballads
Song recordings produced by Walter Afanasieff
Songs about heartache
Songs written by Diane Warren
Tracie Spencer songs